APEX Airlines was a charter and scheduled airline based in Yangon, Myanmar. APEX provided scheduled air services to Myanmar's commercial city Yangon and to Tanintharyi Region with daily flights. It main base was Naypyidaw International Airport

History
APEX Airline Public Company Limited (APEX Airlines) was incorporated on 27 November 2012 for the purpose of providing International and Domestic Air Transport Services and was awarded a provisional Air Operator's Certificate (AOC) to commence its startup process. APEX Airlines was operational and started to serve passengers in March 2015.

The airline ceased operations and handed back its licence to the authorities in August 2018.

Destinations 
APEX Airlines offered scheduled services to:

Myanmar
Mandalay Region
Naypyidaw - Naypyidaw International Airport Base
Tanintharyi Region
Dawei - Dawei Airport
Kawthaung - Kawthaung Airport
Myeik - Myeik Airport
Yangon Region
Yangon - Yangon International Airport

Fleet
The APEX Airlines fleet consisted of the following aircraft (as of September 2017):

See also
List of defunct airlines of Myanmar

References

Defunct airlines of Myanmar
Airlines established in 2015
Airlines disestablished in 2018
Companies based in Yangon